Ares, in comics, may refer to:

 Ares (DC Comics), a DC Comics character and enemy of Wonder Woman
 Ares (Marvel Comics), a Marvel Comics character who started as a villain
 Ares (comic book), a 2006 Marvel Comics comic book mini-series
 Ares (Hercules: The Legendary Journeys and Xena: Warrior Princess), a character from the television show and comics
 Ares (manhwa), a Korean comic series about a group of mercenaries

See also
 Ares (disambiguation)
 Aries (comics), a similarly spelled Marvel Comics villain, members of the Zodiac
 Children of Ares (comics), DC Comics characters

Ares in popular culture